Alexandros 'Alekos' Alavanos (born 22 May 1950 in Athens) is a Greek politician, former member of the Hellenic Parliament and the European Parliament. From 2004 until 2008 he was president of the Coalition of the Left of Movements and Ecology, commonly known as Synaspismos. He was parliamentary leader of the wider Coalition of the Radical Left (SYRIZA).

Biography

Early life
Born on 22 May 1950 in Athens, Alavanos has been politically active since his youth. During the military dictatorship of 1967-1974, Alavanos participated in the student movement against the regime; as a result his military service deferment was revoked and he was briefly incarcerated in the EAT/ESA military prison.

Political career
He was elected to the European Parliament in 1981 with the Communist Party of Greece and again in 1989, 1994 and 1999 with Synaspismos.

In the 2004 Greek legislative election, Alavanos was elected MP in Athens. Since Nikos Konstantopoulos, his predecessor in Synaspismos' leadership, announced his intention not to be a candidate for another term, Alavanos announced his own candidacy for the office. The party congress elected him president on 12 December 2004.

In the 2007 Greek legislative election, running as leader of SYRIZA, which more than doubled its parliamentary seats, he was narrowly elected an MP in Heraklion, Crete.

On 27 November 2007, Alavanos announced that he would not apply for a renewal of his presidency of Synaspismos at its 5th party congress in February 2008, due to private reasons. He was replaced by Alexis Tsipras.

In February 2011 he left Synaspismos and founded the Front of Solidarity and Overthrow with other former members of Coalition of the Radical Left. Communist Organization of Greece, Internationalist Workers' Left, Movement for the United in Action Left and Anticapitalist Political Group joined the front, but they left it in 2012 due to political disputes.

He again founded a new political party in 2013, founding Plan B specifically to contest the 2014 European Parliament election in Greece. The party's platform is centered on exiting Greece from the eurozone.

Personal life
Alekos Alavanos is an economist. He is married to Aikaterini Charalambaki and is the father of two daughters.

See also
 Politics of Greece

Notes

External links

 Short biography in Greek
 
 

 

1950 births
Politicians from Athens
Living people
Communist Party of Greece MEPs
Coalition of Left, of Movements and Ecology MEPs
Greek MPs 2004–2007
Greek MPs 2007–2009
MEPs for Greece 1981–1984
MEPs for Greece 1984–1989
MEPs for Greece 1989–1994
MEPs for Greece 1994–1999
MEPs for Greece 1999–2004
Chairpersons of Synaspismos